Nor Rashidah binti Ramli is a Malaysian politician who served as Member of the Johor State Legislative Assembly (MLA) for Parit Raja since May 2018. She is a member of the United Malays National Organisation (UMNO), a component party of the ruling BN coalition.

Election results

References 

Living people
1979 births
People from Batu Pahat
People from Johor
Malaysian people of Malay descent
Malaysian Muslims
United Malays National Organisation politicians
Women MLAs in Johor
21st-century Malaysian politicians
Members of the Johor State Legislative Assembly
21st-century Malaysian women politicians